Skinny Molly is an American southern rock band from Nashville, Tennessee, United States.

The band was formed in 2004 by guitarist/vocalist Mike Estes (guitar player for Lynyrd Skynyrd and Blackfoot), Dave Hlubek (guitarist and founding member of Molly Hatchet) and drummer Kurt Pietro. Hlubek rejoined Molly Hatchet in 2005 and was replaced by guitarist/vocalist Jay Johnson (formerly played with the Rossington Band and Blackfoot) in 2008. Nashville bluegrass and Grand Ole Opry bassist Luke Bradshaw joined Skinny Molly in 2007. This lineup continues to tour the US and Europe.

They released their first album in 2008 (No Good Deed) on Moss Rose Records. Their second album; Haywire Riot was released on Ruf Records in 2012.

In 2014 they released a new album called Here For A Good Time, the album features Ed King on the song "Make It Easy" and Joey Huffman on several other songs.

Band members

Current
 Mike Estes - Guitar, lead vocals (2004–present)
 Jay Johnson - Guitar, vocals (2008–present)
 Luke Bradshaw - Bass (2007–present)
 Kurt Pietro - Drums (2004–present)

Former
 Dave Hlubek - Guitar (2004–2005)
 Chris Walker - Guitar (2005–2008)
 Kyle Law - Drums (2018–2021)
 Ash Sims - Drums (2005-2007; UK only)

Discography

Studio albums
 No Good Deed – 2008
 Haywire Riot – 2012
 Here for a Good Time – 2014

References

External links 
 

2004 establishments in Tennessee
American country rock groups
American blues rock musical groups
Hard rock musical groups from Tennessee
Musical groups established in 2004
Musical groups from Nashville, Tennessee
American southern rock musical groups
Ruf Records artists